Rauna Parish is an administrative unit of Smiltene Municipality in the Vidzeme region of Latvia (Prior to 2009, it belonged to the former Cēsis District). The administrative center is the village of Rauna.

Towns, villages and settlements of Rauna parish 
 Bormaņi
 Cimza
 Gaiķi
 Kauliņi
 Ķieģeļceplis
 Lisa
 Marijkalns
 Mūri
 Rauna
 Rozes
 Strīķeļi
 Stuķi
 Vieķi

See also 
 Jānis Cimze
 Rauna Castle

Parishes of Latvia
Smiltene Municipality
Vidzeme